Pirate Station is the world's biggest drum and bass music festival. It's held every year since 2003, when St. Petersburg held the first event. It has spread to the biggest Russian cities (Moscow, Ekaterinburg, Novosibirsk, Samara etc.) and has also taken place in Estonia and Ukraine, which makes Pirate Station the biggest Russian dance project ever. Almost half a million people visited the festival during these years. The main St. Petersburg show hosts more than 25,000 fans annually. Pirate Station is not just about music – it is a mix of unique performances and special effects united by a concept which changes every year.

Venues

Saint-Petersburg
SKK Peterburgsky (Capacity: 25000 people) - Years hosted: 2007–2014
Yubileyny Sports Palace (Capacity: 15000 people) - Years hosted: 2003–2006, 2015, 2017
A2 Club (Capacity: 5000 people) - Years hosted: 2016

Moscow
Tuning Hall Club (Capacity: 4800 people) - Years hosted: 2008
Crocus Expo (Capacity: 15000 people) - Years hosted: 2009
LFC CSKA (Capacity: ~10000 people) - Years hosted: 2010,2011
Stadium Live Club (Capacity: 8000 people) - Years hosted: 2012–2016

Lineups
Lineups are different in all cities. These are only some of the artists.

2016 
CIRCUS

Saint-Petersburg (A2 Green Concert)

1st day:
 Andy C
 Delta Heavy
 Misanthrop
 Feint
 Gancher & Ruin
 MC Coppa
 Gvozd
2nd day:
 Sigma
 Prolix
 Emperor
 Teddy Killerz
 Enei
 The Outside Agency
 John B

Plus one more stage with local DNB-artists named "Gvozd & Friends"

Moscow (Stadium Live)

Pendulum
John B
Culture Shock
Counterstrike
Pythius
Lady Waks (With Special DNB Set)
Paperclip
Gvozd

2015 
LOVE

Saint-Petersburg (SP Yubileyny)
 Optiv & BTK
 Gvozd
 Mefjus
 Bad Company
 Gancher & Ruin
 Pendulum
 Original Sin

Moscow (Stadium Live)
 Spor
 Rene Lavice
 Ed Rush
 Dillinja
 Sinister Souls
 Gvozd
 Smooth

2014 
INFERNO

Saint-Petersburg (SKK Peterburgsky)
 Logistics & Nu:Tone (Nu:Logic)
 Black Sun Empire
 Andy C
 Noisia
 Enei
 Gvozd
 MC Tali
 Forbidden Society

Moscow (Stadium Live)
 Enei
 Mind Vortex
 Netsky
 Script MC
 Metrik
 Gvozd
 Fourward
 Evol Intent

2013 
REVOLUTION
 Tantrum Desire
 Netsky (DJ set)
 Friction
 John B (DJ set)
 Pendulum (DJ set)
 Neonlight
 Gvozd
 The Qemists (Soundsystem set)
 Zardonic

2012 
APOCALYPSE
 Dirtyphonics (LIVE)
 Noisia
 John B
 Brookes Brothers (DJ set)
 Technical Itch
 Blokhe4d (DJ set) 
 Gvozd

2011
TEATRO
Dirtyphonics (LIVE)
Aphrodite
John B
Chase & Status (DJ set)
Spor
Current Value
Ed Rush
MC Rage
Tapolsky
Gvozd

2010 
NETWORK
Pendulum
Sub Focus
Noisia
Goldie
Break
Lomax
MC Verse
SP:MC

2009
IMMORTAL

Aphrodite
Noisia
Pendulum
Sub Focus
John B
DJ Hazard
Spor
Chase & Status
MC Jakes

2008
FUTURE
Goldie
TC
Kosheen
Noisia
Aphrodite
Spor
DJ Friction
Sub Focus
Dillinja
Gvozd
Toper

2007 
MC Tali
Grooverider
DJ Hype
Dylan
Dieselboy
Goldie
The Panacea
Total Science
MC Dynamite

2006
The 2006 Pirate Station IV was held in two arenas of the Yubileyny Palace of Sports, St. Petersburg.
Pendulum
DJ Hype
Goldie
Roni Size
Adam F
Bad Company
Technical Itch
Aphrodite

2005
Goldie
Grooverider
Fabio
MC Rage
Pendulum
MC Stirlin

2004
Goldie
LTJ Bukem & MC Conrad
Bad Company

2003
Goldie
Technical Itch
Aphrodite

See also
List of electronic music festivals

References

External links

 Homepage
 Radio Record

Music festivals established in 2003
Electronic music festivals in Russia
Electronic music festivals in Ukraine
Electronic music festivals in Estonia
Drum and bass events